Delogu is a surname.

List of people with the surname 

 Mariano Delogu (1933–2016), Italian politician
 Sébastien Delogu, (born 1987), French politician

See also 

 Delgo, 2008 film

Surnames
Surnames of European origin